Nuria Cabanillas Provencio (born 9 August 1980) is a Spanish rhythmic gymnast and Olympic Champion. She won a gold medal with the Spanish group at the 1996 Summer Olympics in Atlanta. The team was formed by Nuria, Estela Giménez, Marta Baldó, Lorena Guréndez, Estíbaliz Martínez and Tania Lamarca. Also she was three times world champion: two in 3 balls/2 ribbons and one in 3 ribbons/2 hoops. Nuria Cabanillas Provencio retired in 1999.

See also
 List of gymnasts
 List of Olympic medalists in gymnastics (women)
 Gymnastics at the Pan American Games
 World Rhythmic Gymnastics Championships
 Gymnastics at the World Games
 Rhythmic Gymnastics European Championships

References

External links 
 
 
 
 

1980 births
Living people
Spanish rhythmic gymnasts
Olympic gold medalists for Spain
Gymnasts at the 1996 Summer Olympics
Olympic gymnasts of Spain
Olympic medalists in gymnastics
Medalists at the 1996 Summer Olympics
Sportspeople from Badajoz
Medalists at the Rhythmic Gymnastics World Championships
People from Vilafranca del Penedès
Sportspeople from the Province of Barcelona